WSNW (1150 AM) is a radio station broadcasting an adult contemporary and soft rock music format. Licensed to Seneca, South Carolina, United States, the station is currently owned by Toccoa Foundation, Inc. WSNW will have to move its city of license to Walhalla because WGOG will be moving its city of license to Powdersville, and the FCC is requiring that a radio station continue to be licensed to Walhalla. WSNW will be increasing its power to 5,000 watts during the day so that the station can still use the existing tower on Radio Station Road. WSNW can remain at its Ram Cat Alley studios because the studios must be within 25 miles of the city of license. Programming will also remain the same.

Programming
Programming on WSNW includes mostly adult contemporary music, with local talk & news programming mixed in. The station also covers high school sports games involving the Seneca Bobcats.

WSNW is an affiliate of the Atlanta Braves radio network, the largest radio affiliate network in Major League Baseball.

History
WSNW is the oldest radio station in Oconee County. WSNW was an adult standards radio station whose programming could also be heard on WBFM.

In 2008, WSNW added an FM translator station on 103.3 MHz. In March 2014, WSNW became part of the Georgia-Carolina Radiocasting Company, changed formats to adult contemporary music, and its translator moved from 103.3 FM to 94.1 FM, taking on the brand name, "The Lake." The focus of the station shifted away from local news and talk radio, and no longer hosts any talk radio programming.

Effective February 7, 2020, Georgia-Carolina Radiocasting donated the license for WSNW to Toccoa Foundation, Inc.

Translators

References

External links
Official web site

SNW
Seneca, South Carolina